Godfrid Storms (4 May 1911 – 20 October 2003) was a Dutch professor of Old and Middle English Literature at the Catholic University of Nijmegen. He published his seminal dissertation on Anglo-Saxon charms in 1948, superseding a work that had stood as the authority for forty years, before obtaining his professorship there in 1956. Among his many other works were articles on Beowulf and the Sutton Hoo ship-burial.

Early life and education
Godfrid Storms, known as "Frits", was born in Sittard, Netherlands, on 4 May 1911. He was educated at Radboud University Nijmegen where he had Aurelius Pompen as his doctoral adviser, and on 4 June 1948 successfully defended his dissertation.

Career
In 1956 Storms became a Professor of Old and Middle English Literature, also at Radboud University. During his time there he published many articles on the subject, notably The Subjectivity of the Style of Beowulf and Grammatical Expressions of Emotiveness. Other articles also took the Anglo-Saxon epic poem Beowulf as a subject, and another the Sutton Hoo ship-burial discovered in Suffolk in 1939. Among the doctoral students that Storm promoted was W. J. M. Bronzwaer (nl), in 1970, a year after Storms had visited the University of Nottingham as part of an exchange program between it and Radboud.

Storms continued to be known for Anglo-Saxon Magic, his 1948 dissertation which was soon thereafter published. The work comprised an anthropological and psychological discussion of "magic" as understood by the Anglo-Saxons, and a discussion of 86 Anglo-Saxon charms in Old English and Latin. A lengthy review by the Harvard Anglo-Saxonist Francis Peabody Magoun called it an "interesting and important" work that would supersede a work published by Felix Grendon in 1909. "All students of the Anglo-Saxon charms," wrote Magoun Jr., "will be grateful to Dr Storms for his edition, in all respects an advance on Grendon's once important study."

Personal life
Storms had a wife, Gré Wilmink, as well as children, grandchildren, and a great-grandchild. His wife died before him; he himself died on 20 October 2003, at the age of 92, in Nijmegen.

Publications
  
 Correction:  
  
  
  
  
 
  
  
  
  
  
  
 
  
  
  
 
  
  
 
  
 
  
  
 Republished as

References

Bibliography

External links
 Three photographs at: 

1911 births
2003 deaths
Dutch medievalists
People from Sittard
Radboud University Nijmegen alumni
Academic staff of Radboud University Nijmegen